The Cáhuil Bridge is a bridge in Chile, located in the village of Cáhuil, Pichilemu, Chile. It connects Pichilemu and the southern commune of Paredones and the Bucalemu beach resort.

The bridge was completed in 2001.

References

Bridges in Chile
Buildings and structures in Pichilemu
Bridges completed in 2001
Transport in O'Higgins Region